Maxa Nordau (10 January 1897 – 17 September 1993) was a French painter. She was from a Jewish family and was the daughter of Max Nordau, a prominent Zionist. She often travelled in the Middle East, and many of her paintings are portraits or nudes of Arab or Jewish women whom she met there.

Life

She was born on 10 January 1897.
Her parents were Max Nordau (1849–1923) and Anna Dons-Kaufmann.
Her father was a doctor, born in Pest, Hungary, who was associated with Theodor Herzl in creating the state of Israel. In 1892 he wrote Degeneration, in which he violently attacked what he saw as the degenerate art and literature of the time.
Her mother, Anna Dons-Kauffman, was a widow with four children when she married Nordau.
Maxa grew up in a middle-class environment. Her father wrote a book of fairy tales for Maxa with carefully selected messages, which he published in 1905.

Maxa Nordau studied oil and watercolor painting under José María López Mezquita (1883–1954) and Jules Adler (1865–1952). She lived in Spain with her father during World War I (1914–18). She married Kalman (Claude) Gruenblat, and they had a child, Claudie Nordau-Gruenblat. Nordau's work was shown at official exhibitions included the 1924 Colonial Exhibition in Strasbourg. In the Spring of 1926 she visited the United States for a lecture tour in the major cities and an art exhibit at The New Gallery in New York, hosted by the critic George S. Hellman.
Ze'ev Jabotinsky, the Revisionist Zionist leader, sent a letter of greeting in which he wrote:

Maxa Nordau became a member of the Société des femmes artistes modernes (FAM).
This group held its inaugural exhibition in Paris in 1931.  The Jewish members of  FAM such as Nordau, Alice Halicka, Alice Hohermann and Rosette Idzkowski had to deal with growing anti-Semitism in the artistic scene during the 1930s,   Évi Patai published an article on Nordau in the November 1936 issue of József Patai's Mult és Jövő (Budapest). Nordau helped decorate the Palestine pavilion for the Paris Exposition Internationale des Arts et Techniques dans la Vie Moderne of 1937  In 1939 her work was shown in an exhibition of French art in England.

During World War II (1939–45) Nordau exhibited in the US, including several exhibitions in New York City.
She taught painting at the City College of New York. She collaborated with her mother in a life of her father, Max Nordau: A Biography, published in New York by the Nordau Committee in 1943. The work gives an intimate and loving portrait of the man, but not a detailed account of his career. The biography was translated by Ludwig Lewisohn, but Maxa Nordau was critical of it and the Morgen Journal refused payment. After the war Maxa Nordau returned to Paris. She continued to paint and exhibit in various private galleries, and to travel widely in Palestine, Egypt, Syria, Morocco, Turkey and Greece. She considered Israel her homeland. Nordau died on 17 September 1993.

Work

The bulk of Nordau's work consists of portraits, mostly of women.
They include vivid and colourful depictions of Arab women whom she met during her frequent visits to the Middle East.
Although she was French, she is considered to be part of the School of Paris, a group of mostly non-French artists.
She was influenced by her father's Zionist views but did not share his rejection of modernism.
More than other women artists of the day she did not feel a need to represent bourgeois French values of femininity and domesticity.
She often exhibited very naturalistic paintings of nude female Yemenite and Palestinian models whom she met and studied during visits to the Middle East.
She also made portraits of pioneer Jewish women in Palestine and other Middle Eastern countries.
She painted male and female Jewish settlers working the land in Palestine, and idealized desert landscapes.
She exhibited in Paris in the Salon d'Automne, Salon des Independants, Salon Société Coloniale Nouveau, Galerie Zivy, Galerie Simonson and Galerie Carmine and others.

Publications
Nordau illustrated several books.
Publications include:

References

Sources

1897 births
1993 deaths
French people of Hungarian-Jewish descent
French people of Danish descent
20th-century French painters
School of Paris
French women painters